Shinwa may refer to several Japanese terms:

"Harmony"

Shinwa (新和 "new harmony")
Shinwa, Kumamoto (新和町 Shinwa-machi)

Shinwa (親和 "fraternal harmony")
Shinwa, short for Kobe Shinwa Women's University (神戸親和女子大学 Kobe shinwa joshi daigaku) 
Shinwa-kai (親和会) a yakuza group based in Takamatsu, Kagawa 
Shinwa-kai (Sumiyoshi-ikka) another yazkuza group based in Tochigi-shi, Tochigi

Shinwa (信和 "trust and harmony")
Shinwa Kataoka (片岡信和 1985) Japanese actor

Shinwa (神話 "myth")
Shinwa (EP), an EP by Malice Mizer
"Shinwa", a song by Hiroshi Ohguri